Benedikt Steffen Gimber (born 19 February 1997) is a German footballer who plays as a centre-back for Jahn Regensburg.

Career
In June 2017, Gimber was loaned out to SSV Jahn Regensburg by 1899 Hoffenheim.

In May 2017, it was announced he would join FC Ingolstadt 04 for the 2018–19 season having agreed a contract until 2021. The transfer fee paid to Hoffenheim was reported as €1 million.

On 27 August 2019, he returned to Regensburg.

Honours
Individual
 Fritz Walter Medal U17 Gold: 2014

References

External links
 

1997 births
Living people
People from Buchen
Sportspeople from Karlsruhe (region)
German footballers
Association football defenders
Germany youth international footballers
TSG 1899 Hoffenheim players
TSG 1899 Hoffenheim II players
SV Sandhausen players
Karlsruher SC players
SSV Jahn Regensburg players
FC Ingolstadt 04 players
2. Bundesliga players
Regionalliga players
Footballers from Baden-Württemberg